Hastings Chapel may refer to:

 Hastings Chapel, Kolkata, West Bengal, India
 Hastings Chapel, in Greyfriars, Coventry, England
 Hastings Chapel, in St Helen's Church, Ashby-de-la-Zouch, Leicestershire, England